The 1966–67 English football season was Aston Villa's 67th season in the Football League. The period is considered one of decline for the club  and, this season, Villa were relegated from the Football League First Division.  Blackpool would join them in the Football League Second Division.

In October 1966 Chelsea's offer of £100,000 for Tony Hateley was accepted and he moved to west London. Although manager offered the chance to remain, Manchester United squad player, Willie Anderson decided to join Villa in order to find first team football  for a fee of £20,000 in January 1967.

Taylor's heavy investment in new players failed disastrously, resulting in Villa being relegated to the Second Division of English football and plunging the club deep into financial trouble. It was only the third time Aston Villa had been relegated in the club's history. Taylor was sacked not long afterwards.

Tommy Cummings was appointed Aston Villa manager in the summer of 1967.

Football League First Division

First team squad
  Colin Withers, Goalkeeper, 26
  John Sleeuwenhoek, Centre-Back, 22
  Charlie Aitken, Left-Back, 24 
  Mick Wright, Right-Back, 19
  Keith Bradley, Right-Back, 20
  Mike Tindall, Defensive Midfield, 25
  Peter Broadbent, Midfielder, 32
  Bobby Park, Central Midfield, 19
  Lew Chatterley, Central Midfield, 21
  Johnny MacLeod, Right Midfield, 27
  Dave Pountney, Right Midfield, 26
  Tony Scott, Left Midfield, 25
  Alan Deakin, Midfielder, 24
  Willie Hamilton, Forward, 28
  John Woodward, Forward, 19
  Willie Anderson, Left Winger, 19
  Dave Rudge, Left Winger, 18
  Barry Stobart, Second Striker, 28
  Tony Hateley, Centre-Forward, 25 (until October 1966)

References

External links
AVFC History: 1966-67 season

Aston Villa F.C. seasons
Aston Villa F.C. season